Company's Coming is a popular line of cookbooks that has sold over 30 million copies since 1981. The series is produced by Company's Coming Publishing Limited based in Edmonton, Alberta. The series was written by Jean Paré.

Founded in 1981, the Company's Coming series comprises over 200 cookbooks, each on a single subject.

In 2009, Company's Coming Editor Laurie Stempfle wrote Gold: Small Plates for Sharing which received the Canadian Culinary Gold award in the Cookbook category.

Author

Paré started as a caterer. In 1981, at the age of 54, she self-published her first cookbook, printing 15,000 copies of 150 Delicious Squares. The book was sold in specially designed racks at gas stations, grocery stores and at local fairs. This first book started the Company's Coming company. Paré died on December 24, 2022, at the age of 95.

Recipes
During the late 80s, Paré asked a local Morinville, Alberta resident, Jeannette Bachand, for some recipes to include in an upcoming cookbook.  The first of Bachand's recipes were published in 1989 after Bachand called Company's Coming for a specific recipe for green tomatoes.  There were no recipes for such a thing and was called by Paré for some recipes.  When Dinners of the World was being written for release in 1991, Pare asked Bachand for French Canadian recipes.  Four of the recipes are featured in the book, but her name is not due to the company's style.

List of cookbooks

This is a list of cookbooks in order of series then date they were released.
Updated Oct. 2022

Original Series

Focus Series

Canada Cooks

Healthy Cooking Series

Essential Series
The Company's Coming Essential Slow Cooker (Sep/13)
The Essential Company's Coming Chicken (Jan/14)
The Essential Guys' Cookbook (May/14)

Wild Canada Series
Canadian Fishing Cookbook (Jun/13)
Canadian Outdoor Cookbook (Jun/13)
Canadian Wild Game Cookbook (Sep/14)

Special Occasion Series

Most Loved Recipe Collection

Combination Cookbooks

Practical Gourmet

Kids Cooking
Kids Only! Snacks (Aug/97)
Lunches (Jul/98)
After-School Snacks (Aug/00)
Bag Lunches (Aug/00)
Weekend Treats (Aug/00)
Kids Cook! Bonus Pack (Jan/04)
Kid's Cook 3-in-1 (Jul/10)
Kids Snack 'n' Bake (Jul/11)

Pattern Series

Sewing Aprons (Sept/11)
Quilting Pot Holders (Sept/11)
Crocheting Slippers (Sept/11)
Knitting for Dogs (Nov/11)
Crocheting Toys (Nov/11)
Knitting Winter Accessories (Nov/11)

Workshop Series

Creative Series

Card Making (Feb/08) 
Knitting (Feb/08)
Patchwork Quilting (Feb/08)
Beading (Dec/08)
Crocheting (Dec/08)
Sewing (Dec/08)

Lifestyle Series

Greatest Hits Series
Biscuits, Muffins & Loaves (Apr/99)
Dips, Spreads & Dressings (Apr/99)
Sandwiches & Wraps (Apr/00)
Soups & Salads (Apr/00)
Italian (May/01)
Mexican (May/01)

Pint Size Series
Buffets (May/93)
Finger Food (May/93)
Party Planning (May/93)
Baking Delights (Nov/94)
Chocolate (Oct/95)
Beverages (Oct/97)

Assorted Titles
Beef Today! (Feb/97)
Beans & Rice (May/97)
Sauces & Marinades (May/97)
Ground Beef (May/97)
Family Table (Sep/97)
Make-Ahead Salads (Feb/98)
No-Bake Desserts (Feb/98)
30-Minute Meals (Feb/98)
The Canadian Food Encyclopedia (Oct/13)

References

External links
Company's Coming official website

Publications established in 1981
Series of books
Canadian cookbooks